Artem Albertovych Shchedryi (born 9 November 1992) is a Ukrainian professional footballer who plays as a left midfielder for lithuanian club FK Panevėžys.

Club career

Early years
He is a product of Olimpik Donetsk and Dynamo Kyiv academies.

Volyn Lutsk
Shchedryi made his debut for Volyn Lutsk entering as a second-half substitute against Metalurh Zaporizhzhia on 27 April 2013 in the Ukrainian Premier League.

Honours
Zirka Kropyvnytskyi
 Ukrainian First League: 2015–16

Dnipro-1
 Ukrainian First League: 2018–19

FCI Levadia
 Estonian Supercup: 2022

References

External links
 
 

1992 births
Living people
Sportspeople from Kherson Oblast
Ukrainian footballers
Ukraine youth international footballers
Association football midfielders
FC Dynamo Kyiv players
FC Dynamo-2 Kyiv players
FC Volyn Lutsk players
FC Zirka Kropyvnytskyi players
FC Oleksandriya players
FC Olimpik Donetsk players
SC Dnipro-1 players
FC Inhulets Petrove players
FC Kryvbas Kryvyi Rih players
FCI Levadia Tallinn players
1. SK Prostějov players
Ukrainian Premier League players
Ukrainian First League players
Meistriliiga players
Czech National Football League players
Ukrainian expatriate footballers
Expatriate footballers in Estonia
Ukrainian expatriate sportspeople in Estonia
Expatriate footballers in the Czech Republic
Ukrainian expatriate sportspeople in the Czech Republic